The 2006 NCAA Division III Men's Ice Hockey Tournament was the culmination of the 2005–06 season, the 23rd such tournament in NCAA history. It concluded with Middlebury defeating St. Norbert in the championship game 3-0. All First Round and Quarterfinal matchups were held at home team venues, while all succeeding games were played at the First Arena in Elmira, New York.

The tournament was expanded to 10 teams with an additional at-large bid offered to a team judges to be the best who had neither received an automatic bid nor one of the regional at-large bids.

Massachusetts–Dartmouth was the first NCAA tournament game for any team from ECAC Northeast.

Qualifying teams
The following teams qualified for the tournament. Automatic bids were offered to the conference tournament champion of seven different conferences. One at-large bid was available for the best non-conference champion for each region with one additional at-large bid for the best remaining team regardless of region.

Format
The tournament featured four rounds of play. All rounds were Single-game elimination. For the three eastern Quarterfinals the teams were seeded according to their rankings. The two lowest-seeded eastern teams played a first round game while the remaining five teams received byes into Quarterfinal round. The top-seeded eastern team played the winner of the eastern first round game. For the western quarterfinal, the top-ranked team awaited the winner of a first round game between the lower-ranked teams. The higher-seeded team served as host for each game of the first round and quarterfinals.

Tournament bracket

Note: * denotes overtime period(s)

Record by conference

References

External links
Division III Men's Ice Hockey Record Book

 
NCAA Division III ice hockey